Blacktop Wasteland is a noir mystery novel written by S. A. Cosby and published in July 2020 by Flatiron Books.

Plot
Beauregard “Bug” Montage, the protagonist, is a black auto mechanic and auto shop owner in a small southern town in rural Virginia. He is also exceedingly talented behind the wheel of a car. Beauregard no longer engages in crime, supporting his wife and two sons on the straight and narrow. But his auto shop is falling deeper into debt. And "...one son needs braces. The other son needs glasses. His embittered mother faces eviction from the nursing home." He decides to do one last heist so he can get back into the black. Perhaps ironically, as Beauregard reenters the unsavory underbelly world of crime figures, "...he realizes that he feels more at home...than he ever did in the straight life." The reader is a witness as that one last heist goes awry and Beauregard gets caught up in the chaos that follows.

Awards
In 2021, this book won the Anthony Awards. It also won the 2020 Los Angeles Times Book Prize. And it was chosen as a New York Times Notable Book

See also
Razorblade Tears, also by S.A. Cosby

References

External links

2020 American novels
American mystery novels
American thriller novels
Flatiron Books books
African-American novels